"Ten Storey Love Song" is a song by The Stone Roses, released as the second single from their album Second Coming on 27 February 1995. It was written by guitarist John Squire.

It reached number 11 and spent three weeks in the UK Singles Chart. The B-sides "Moses" and "Ride On" were the last new songs released by the group until the single "All for One" was released in 2016.

A music video, directed by Sophie Muller, accompanied the single but the video was shot without the drummer, Reni, who did not turn up. Only three members of the band (Squire, Ian Brown and Mani) appear in the video although an unidentified man wearing a mask of Reni's face appears several times. Ian Brown did not turn up for the first day of the video shoot, this is reflected in the video when John Squire and Mani are watching footage of Ian Brown and Reni on a TV screen and look at their watches.

The song is on the Roses' second album, Second Coming. It is the third song, fading into "Daybreak".

In 2009 the British writer Richard Milward named his second novel after this song.

Singer, songwriter, and musician Pete Yorn covered this song on his 2021 album Pete Yorn Sings the Classics.

Track listing
7" vinyl (Geffen GFS 87) Cassette (Geffen GFSC 87)
 Ten Storey Love Song
 Ride On

12" vinyl (Geffen GFST 87) CD (Geffen GFSTD 87)
 Ten Storey Love Song
 Moses
 Ride On

External links
The Definitive Stone Roses Discography entry

1995 singles
The Stone Roses songs
Music videos directed by Sophie Muller
1994 songs
Songs written by John Squire
Song recordings produced by John Leckie
Geffen Records singles